La Coloma Airport  is an airport serving the city of Pinar del Río, in Cuba. It is located near the village of La Coloma and has no regular flights.

Facilities

La Coloma Air Training

The airport is home to a training unit of the Cuban Revolutionary Armed Forces:

 1660th Primary Training Squadron (L-39C)

See also
 Pinar del Río Airport

References

External links
 

Airports in Cuba
Military installations of Cuba
Pinar del Río
Buildings and structures in Pinar del Río Province